The current flag of Alabama (the second in Alabama state history) was adopted by Act 383 of the Alabama Legislature on February 16, 1895:
{{quote|"The flag of the State of Alabama shall be a crimson cross of St. Andrew on a field of white. The bars forming the cross shall be not less than six inches broad, and must extend diagonally across the flag from side to side." – (Code 1896, §3751; Code 1907, §2058; Code 1923, §2995; Code 1940, T. 55, §5.)}}

The cross of St. Andrew referred to in the law is a diagonal cross, known in vexillology as a saltire. In 2001, a survey conducted by the North American Vexillological Association ranked Alabama's state flag 29th in design quality of the 72 Canadian provincial, U.S. state and U.S. territorial flags. There are sources that believe the saltire was intended to memorialize the Confederacy, but no legislative records indicate the inspiration for the flag.

History

1861 flag
 

On January 11, 1861, the Alabama Secession Convention passed a resolution designating an official flag. Designed by several women from Montgomery, final touches were made by Francis Corra of that city. One side of the flag displayed the goddess of Liberty holding an unsheathed sword in her right hand; in her left, she held a small blue flag with one gold star. Above the gold star appears the text "Alabama" in all capital letters. In an arch above this figure were the words "Independent Now and Forever". The reverse side of the flag had a cotton plant with a coiled rattlesnake. The text "Noli Me Tangere", ("Touch Me Not" in Latin), was placed below the cotton plant. 
This flag was flown until February 10, 1861, when it was removed to the governor's office after it was damaged by severe weather. It was never flown again.

Current flag

Alabama's current flag was adopted in 1895. The legislation introduced by Representative John W. A. Sanford Jr. stipulates: "The flag of the state of Alabama shall be a crimson cross of St. Andrew on a field of white. The bars forming the cross shall be not less than six inches broad, and must extend diagonally across the flag from side to side." St. Andrew's cross represents the cross on which St. Andrew was crucified.

The legislation that created the state flag did not specify that the flag was to be square but defined the width of the bars of the cross.  In 1987, the office of Alabama Attorney General Don Siegelman stated in a letter that the proper shape of the state flag is rectangular, as it had been depicted numerous times in official publications and reproductions. Despite this, the flag is still often depicted as being square, even in official publications of the U.S. federal government.

The saltire of Alabama's flag most closely resembles the saltire of the flag of Florida, which was derived from the Spanish Cross of Burgundy. Southern Alabama was originally part of Spanish Florida and subsequently West Florida. 

Alabama adopted its flag design in 1895, five years earlier than Florida did.

Theories on origin
No documentation in the legislative records indicates the flag was intended to commemorate the Confederacy. In 1900, the Montgomery Advertiser reported the flag was "a memory and a suggestion of the Confederate battle flag". In 1906, the Birmingham Age-Herald published a piece that stated the Alabama state flag "has no history woven into it". 

Within a few decades after the flag was adopted, several sources said that the design was drawn from the battle flag. Thomas M. Owen, the first director of the Alabama Department of Archives and History, wrote in 1915 that the flag bill's sponsor and the rest of the legislature had intended to "preserve, in permanent form, some of the more distinctive features of the Confederate battle flag". The authors of a 1917 article in National Geographic'' expressed their opinion that the Alabama flag was based on the Confederate battle flag. In 1924, Bell Allen Ross, a member of the Daughters of the Confederacy, said that John W.A. Sanford Jr. modeled his design of the Alabama flag on the battle flag used by his father, John W. A. Sanford commanding the Hilliard's Legion regiment. Sanford's design was meant to preserve some of the distinctive features of the Confederate battle flag, particularly the Saint Andrews Cross. Alabama Attorney General Don Siegelman's letter in 1987 also referenced that the flag was modeled after Sandford's 60th Alabama Infantry Regiment battle flag.

Some commentators have interpreted the red saltire as a commemoration of Alabama's contributions to the Confederacy, since the flag was adopted during a period of promotion of the "Lost Cause" of the culture of the antebellum South. Other former Confederate slave states, beginning with Mississippi, and followed by Florida, had also adopted new state flags around the same time that they disenfranchised African Americans and passed laws establishing Jim Crow segregation. 

But other contemporary commentators, such as Steve Murray, Director of the Alabama Department of History and Archives, believe the origins of the flag are unclear. According to Murray, the flag's connections to the battle flag are thin and based on suppositions. Murray said, "I would conclude that if they were wanting to evoke the Confederate battle flag, they would have been more explicit about doing it either in the design which could have more closely resembled the Confederate flag." Murray also noted that Alabama may have wanted to approve a new state flag to prepare for an exposition in Atlanta, Georgia later that year.

Governor's flag

The flag of the governor of Alabama is a variant of the state flag. In the top saltire, the flag displays the state coat of arms. The bottom saltire contains the state military crest, which consists of a cotton plant with full bursting boll.

See also

Flag of Jersey
Seal of Alabama
Saint Patrick's Saltire
Spanish Empire
List of Alabama state symbols

References

External links
Alabama State Flag  at the Alabama Department of Archives & History
written account of the flag in 1987 by Don Siegelman, Alabama Attorney General

Alabama
Symbols of Alabama
Alabama
Flags of Alabama
Alabama
Alabama
1895 establishments in Alabama